Bruk may refer to:

 Bruk, Pomeranian Voivodeship, a village in Poland
 bruk, a term for a broken beat in music